Tanintharyi Region Government is the cabinet of the Tanintharyi Region of Myanmar.  The cabinet is led by chief minister, Myint Maung.The ministers are look like minister without portfolio except minister of municipality affairs.

Cabinet (2016-Incumbent)

References 

 http://www.president-office.gov.mm/?q=cabinet/region-and-state-government/id-10187
 http://www.president-office.gov.mm/?q=briefing-room/orders/2017/02/20/id-11779

State and region governments of Myanmar
Tanintharyi Region